Kleines theater – Kammerspiele Landshut is a theatre in Landshut, Bavaria, Germany.

Theatres in Bavaria
Buildings and structures in Landshut